The Thomas Bond House is located at 129 South Second Street in Old City, Philadelphia, Pennsylvania. Originally built in 1769, as the home of Dr. Thomas Bond, it has since been restored into a bed and breakfast. 

The house was listed on the Philadelphia Register of Historic Places in 1968 and is within the Old City Historic District, a district on the National Register of Historic Places. It is adjacent to the Independence National Historical Park about 3 blocks east of Independence Hall. The main entrance faces south towards Welcome Park, the former location of William Penn's Slate Roof House.

History 
The history of the Bond house reflects the economic history of this part of Philadelphia. The central core of the Bond house was built in 1769 by Dr. Thomas Bond Sr., a prominent physician and founder of Pennsylvania Hospital, which was chartered in 1751. In 1824, a four-foot extension with a new facade was added to the west side, and in the 1830s to 1840s, the building was extended eastward at the rear.

In 1988, the property was leased to a private business by managers of the Independence Historical National Park in order to facilitate restoration of the building. As a result, it was converted into a bed and breakfast.

References

External links 

Independence National Historical Park
Thomas Bond House, Historical Marker Database
Thomas Bond House, Pennsylvania Historical and Museum Commission: ExplorePAhistory.com

Houses on the National Register of Historic Places in Philadelphia
Bed and breakfasts in Pennsylvania
Houses completed in 1769
1769 establishments in Pennsylvania
Georgian architecture in Pennsylvania